The Eckerd Tritons are composed of 14 teams representing Eckerd College in intercollegiate athletics, including men and women's basketball, golf, sailing, soccer, and tennis. Men's sports include baseball. Women's sports include softball, volleyball, and beach volleyball. The Tritons compete in the NCAA Division II and are members of the Sunshine State Conference.

Teams 
Eckerd College sponsors teams in 5 men's and eight women's NCAA sanctioned sports:

Men's Intercollegiate Sports
 Baseball
 Basketball
 Golf 
 Sailing *
 Soccer 
 Tennis

Women's Intercollegiate Sports
 Basketball
 Beach volleyball #
 Golf 
 Sailing *
 Soccer
 Softball
 Tennis
 Volleyball

 * = Sailing is sanctioned by the Intercollegiate Sailing Association, not by the NCAA.
 # = Beach volleyball is a fully sanctioned NCAA sport which had its first national championship in the spring of 2016. Eckerd competes as an independent.

Baseball
Eckerd has had 28 Major League Baseball Draft selections since the draft began in 1965.

References

External links